Righteous Among the Nations ("righteous (plural) of the world's nations") is an honorific used by the State of Israel to describe non-Jews who risked their lives during the Holocaust to save Jews from extermination by the Nazis for altruistic reasons. The term originates with the concept of "righteous gentiles", a term used in rabbinic Judaism to refer to non-Jews, called , who abide by the Seven Laws of Noah.

Bestowing 
When Yad Vashem, the Shoah Martyrs' and Heroes' Remembrance Authority, was established in 1953 by the Knesset, one of its tasks was to commemorate the "Righteous Among the Nations". The Righteous were defined as non-Jews who risked their lives to save Jews during the Holocaust.

Since 1963, a commission headed by a justice of the Supreme Court of Israel has been charged with the duty of awarding the honorary title "Righteous Among the Nations". Guided in its work by certain criteria, the commission meticulously studies all documentation including evidence by survivors and other eyewitnesses, evaluates the historical circumstances and the element of risk to the rescuer, and then decides if the case meets the criteria. Those criteria are:
 Only a Jewish party can put forward a nomination
 Helping a family member or helping a Jew who converted to Christianity is not ground for recognition;
 Assistance has to be repeated or substantial
 Assistance has to be given without any financial gain expected in return (although covering expenses such as food is acceptable)

The award has been given without regard to the social rank of the helper. It has been given to royalty such as Princess Alice of Battenberg, Queen Mother Helen of Romania and Queen Elisabeth of Belgium but also to others like the philosopher Jacques Ellul and to Amsterdam department store employee Hendrika Gerritsen.

A person who is recognized as Righteous for having taken risks to help Jews during the Holocaust is awarded a medal in their name, a certificate of honor, and the privilege of having the name added to those on the Wall of Honor in the Garden of the Righteous at Yad Vashem in Jerusalem (the last is in lieu of a tree planting, which was discontinued for lack of space). The awards are distributed to the rescuers or their next of kin during ceremonies in Israel, or in their countries of residence through the offices of Israel's diplomatic representatives. These ceremonies are attended by local government representatives and are given wide media coverage.

The Yad Vashem Law authorizes Yad Vashem "to confer honorary citizenship upon the Righteous Among the Nations, and if they have died, the commemorative citizenship of the State of Israel, in recognition of their actions". Anyone who has been recognized as "Righteous" is entitled to apply to Yad Vashem for the certificate. If the person is no longer alive, their next of kin is entitled to request that commemorative citizenship be conferred on the Righteous who has died.

In total,  men and women from 51 countries have been recognized, amounting to more than 10,000 authenticated rescue stories. Yad Vashem's policy is to pursue the program for as long as petitions for this title are received and are supported by evidence that meets the criteria.

Recipients who choose to live in the State of Israel are entitled to a pension equal to the average national wage and free health care, as well as assistance with housing and nursing care.

Righteous settled in Israel
At least 130 Righteous non-Jews have settled in Israel. They were welcomed by Israeli authorities, and were granted citizenship. In the mid-1980s, they became entitled to special pensions. Some of them settled in British Mandatory Palestine before Israel's establishment shortly after World War II, or in the early years of the new state of Israel, while others came later. Those who came earlier often spoke fluent Hebrew and have integrated into Israeli society. Children and grandchildren of Righteous Gentiles are entitled to a temporary residence visa in Israel, but not Israeli citizenship.

Other signs of veneration

One Righteous Among the Nations, Saint Elizabeth Hesselblad of Sweden, has been canonized a saint in the Catholic Church. Five others have been beatified: Giuseppe Girotti and Odoardo Focherini of Italy, Klymentiy Sheptytsky of Ukraine, Bernhard Lichtenberg of Germany, and Sára Salkaházi of Hungary.

Maria Skobtsova of Paris and her companions are recognised as martyrs in the Eastern Orthodox Church. Her feast day is 20 July.

In 2015, Lithuania's first street sign honoring a Righteous Among the Nations was unveiled in Vilnius. The street is named Onos Šimaitės gatvė, after Ona Šimaitė, a Vilnius University librarian who helped and rescued Jewish people in the Vilna Ghetto.

In Zvolen, Slovakia, the Park of Generous Souls commemorates the Righteous Among the Nations from Slovakia.

Beginning in 2018, China's most significant World War II museum, the War of Resistance Museum, features China's Righteous Among the Nations and other Chinese figures who helped Jews escape Europe.

Number of awards by country
, the award has been made to 27,921 people. This Yad Vashem highlights that the table is not representative of the effort or proportion of Jews saved per country, and notes that these numbers "are not necessarily an indication of the actual number of rescuers in each country, but reflect the cases that were made available to Yad Vashem."

See also

 British Hero of the Holocaust
 European Day of the Righteous
 Individuals and groups assisting Jews during the Holocaust
 List of Righteous Among the Nations by country
 Righteousness
 Virtuous pagan
 Żegota

References

Notes

Bibliography 
The Heart Has Reasons: Holocaust Rescuers and Their Stories of Courage, Mark Klempner, The Pilgrim Press.
Righteous Gentiles of the Holocaust: Genocide and Moral Obligation, David P. Gushee, Paragon House Publishers.
The Lexicon of the Righteous Among the Nations, Yad Vashem, Jerusalem. (volumes: Poland, France, Netherlands, Belgium, Europe I, Europe II).
To Save a Life: Stories of Holocaust Rescue, Land-Weber, Ellen, University of Illinois Press.
The Seven Laws of Noah, Lichtenstein, Aaron, New York: The Rabbi Jacob Joseph School Press, 1981, ASIN B00071QH6S.
The Image of the Non-Jew in Judaism, Novak, David, Lewiston, New York: Edwin Mellen Press, 1983.
The Path of the Righteous: Gentile Rescuers of Jews During the Holocaust, Paldiel, Mordecai, KTAV Publishing House, Inc.
 Among the Righteous: Lost Stories from the Holocaust's Long Reach into Arab Lands, Robert Satloff, Washington Institute for Near East Policy, (PublicAffairs, 2006) .
When Light Pierced the Darkness: Christian Rescue of Jews in Nazi-Occupied Poland, Tec, Nechama, Oxford University Press.
Zegota: The Council to Aid Jews in Occupied Poland 1942-1945, Tomaszewski, Irene & Werbowski, Tecia, Price-Patterson.
Tolerance in Judaism: The Medieval and Modern Sources, Zuesse, Evan M., In: The Encyclopaedia of Judaism, edited by Jacob Neusner, A. Avery-Peck, and W.S. Green, Second Edition, Leiden: Brill Publishers, 2005, Vol. IV: 2688-2713.
When Courage Was Stronger Than Fear: Remarkable Stories of Christians Who Saved Jews from the Holocaust by Peter Hellman. 2nd edition, Marlowe & Companym, 1999.
Rescue and Flight: American Relief Workers Who Defied the Nazis, Subak, Susan Elisabeth, University of Nebraska Press, 342 pp., 2010.
Ugo G. Pacifici Noja e Silvia Pacifici Noja, Il cacciatore di giusti: storie di non ebrei che salvarono i figli di Israele dalla Shoah, Cantalupa Torinese, Effatà, 2010, (in Italian), .
 Paul Greveillac, Les fronts clandestins : quinze histoires de Justes (in French), Nicolas Eybalin publishing, 2014.

External links 

 The Righteous Among the Nations at Yad Vashem. Its online exhibitions include:
 "Their Fate Will Be My Fate Too…" Teachers Who Rescued Jews During the Holocaust
Spots of Light: Women in the Holocaust
 
 Heroes and Heroines of the Holocaust at the Holocaust Survivors' Network
 Rescuers at the Jewish Virtual Library
 The Jewish Foundation for the Righteous at JFR.org
 Auschwitz: Inside the Nazi State at the American public television broadcaster PBS
 zyciezazycie.pl, a site commemorating Poles who gave their lives to save Jews
 Gardens of the Righteous Worldwide Committee
 Essay: "Paying the ultimate price" by Irena Steinfeldt, The Jerusalem Post, 14 April 2009.
 

 
Yad Vashem